Islām Towarabaf, sometimes called Eslām Tavāreh Bāf, is a village in Jowzjan Province, in northern Afghanistan.

See also
 Jowzjan Province

References

Populated places in Jowzjan Province